Stoke-on-Trent railway station is a mainline railway station serving the city of Stoke-on-Trent, on the Stafford to Manchester branch of the West Coast Main Line. It also provides an interchange between local services running through Cheshire, Staffordshire and Derbyshire.

History 

The Victorian station buildings were opened on 9 October 1848. The other buildings located in Winton Square, including the North Stafford Hotel, were opened in June 1849. All these buildings were constructed by John Jay to the design of H.A. Hunt of London, using an architectural style referred to as "robust Jacobean manor-house". The station was built by the North Staffordshire Railway Company (NSR) and, until the amalgamation of 1923, housed the company's boardroom and its principal offices.

Stoke-on-Trent is the hub of North Staffordshire's passenger train service. All of these routes closed to passenger traffic in the 1950s and 1960s, though the line to Leek remained in use for sand and stone traffic to Caldon Low and Oakamoor quarries until the mid-1980s.

Design
The station is situated in Winton Square, which is described as Britain's only piece of major town planning undertaken by a railway company specifically to offset a station building. The station is a grade II* listed building, one of four listed buildings in the square—the North Stafford Hotel, directly opposite the station, is also grade II* listed while a statue of Josiah Wedgwood and a row of railway cottages either side of the square are grade II listed.

The building is constructed of dark red brick with black diapering and stone dressings. It has three Dutch-style gables; the central gable has a prominent first-floor bay window, which is decoratively mullioned, above which is a parapet bearing the NSR's coat of arms. Behind the bay window is the boardroom of the NSR, while the remainder of the upper floor was designed as office space. Either side of the bay window is a terrace, which runs across the top of an arcade of Tuscan columns flanking seven arches, each of which contains a fanlight.

The station today 

Stoke-on-Trent station is managed by Avanti West Coast. It has three passenger platforms and, until recently, had one central through line without a platform, which has now been removed. The main entrance to the station is from Winton Square, opposite the North Stafford Hotel, into a large modern booking hall; it has an enquiry office, Fast Ticket machines, an HSBC cashpoint and level access to platform 1 from which southbound and eastbound trains normally depart. On this platform are the main buildings, refreshment room and bar which sells cigarettes, newspapers and a selection of magazines, free CCTV-covered cycle-locking racks, a post box, free newly refurbished toilets for both ladies and gentlemen, a refurbished waiting room, a first class lounge with Wi-Fi and offices for the British Transport Police. In April 2011, a series of FalcoLevel two-tier cycle parking systems were installed providing secure accommodation for up to 66 bikes.

There is both a tiled passenger subway and a passenger operated lift connecting platform 1 with platforms 2 and 3. Northbound trains usually depart from platform 2, which has a newly refurbished waiting room, ladies' and gentlemen's toilets. Platform 3 is a short bay platform used by Northern Trains' regional services to Manchester Piccadilly, which currently depart at xx:56 (Monday to Saturday daytime) and call at all stations excluding Longport.

The station building retains much of its mid-Victorian character, including a classic glazed roof, built in 1893, that spans the platforms. A war memorial, with brass nameplates naming the employees of the North Staffordshire Railway who fell during World War I, discreetly flanks the entrance to platform 1. The station underwent restoration work in the 1990s, having fallen into disrepair.

In May 2009, the main platform (platform 1) was lengthened to accommodate longer trains and the middle line was removed with platform 2 lengthened during 2011.

On 14 September 2015, the station began its new development project. Platform 1 saw the introduction of automatic ticket barriers in December 2015, along with new Fast Ticket Machines. The historic entrance onto platform 2 following reconstruction work was re-opened in February 2016 with new automatic ticket barriers and Fast Ticket machines. Alongside this, a new retail space will open on platform 2. The Platform 2 waiting room was also refreshed and redeveloped, opening in January 2016.

Services
The station is located on both the Stafford to Manchester Line and the Crewe to Derby Line; it is also served by trains between London Euston and Manchester Piccadilly via the Trent Valley Line. Services are operated by Avanti West Coast, CrossCountry, East Midlands Railway, London Northwestern and Northern Trains.

In April 2006, Network Rail organised its maintenance and train control operations into "26 Routes". The main line through Stoke-on-Trent forms part of Route 18 (the West Coast main line).  The line from Derby to the junction just south of Stoke-on-Trent station forms part of Route 19 (the Midland Main Line and East Midlands).

Major destinations served by 'through' (direct service) express trains include: to the south London Euston, Birmingham, Oxford, Reading, Southampton, Bristol and Bournemouth; and to the north the shuttle service to Manchester Piccadilly.

Destinations served by local and regional trains include: to the north Crewe and Macclesfield; to the east Uttoxeter, Derby, Nottingham and Newark-on-Trent; and to the south Stafford and Wolverhampton. There is now an hourly semi-fast direct service from Crewe to London Euston via Stone, which was introduced in December 2008. This was modified in December 2018, following the change of franchise operator, and now runs via Birmingham, Coventry and Northampton instead of via Tamworth.

The nearby Etruria railway station, one mile to the north, was closed to passengers in 2005. The small village stations of Wedgwood and Barlaston, a few miles to the south, are permanently served by a replacement bus service; the local stopping service to Stafford was withdrawn in 2003 when the line was temporarily closed for upgrading and was never reinstated afterwards.

Freight trains on Mondays, carrying Cornish clay for use in Stoke's pottery industry, pass through the station.  These trains supply an industrial spur line at Cliffe Vale, just north of Stoke station.

Freight trains on Fridays also take various freight wagons from Arpley Sidings outside Warrington, to Axiom Rail (Stoke Marcroft). They head here for general repairs, maintenance and sometimes conversions. The return up to Arpley Sidings Warrington with completed wagons happens normally on the same day.

Service frequency

Stoke-on-Trent railway station is currently served by five train operating companies. Stations below are where the service terminates and does not include through station frequencies.

Northbound

Northbound services are split between platform 2 for most northbound traffic and platform 3 for the Piccadilly shuttle:

 Crewe 2tph, run by East Midlands Railway and London Northwestern Railway
 Manchester Piccadilly 2tph, run by Avanti West Coast
 Manchester Piccadilly 1tph, run by Crosscountry
 Stockport 1tpd, run by Northern Trains
 Manchester Piccadilly 1tph, run by Northern Trains

Eastbound

All eastbound services depart from platform 1 and are run exclusively by East Midlands Railway on the Crewe–Derby line, providing local services within the metropolitan region. Services depart eastbound to Derby, from Crewe via Stoke-on-Trent at a frequency of 1tph.

Southbound

Southbound services depart from platform 1 to a range of regional and national destinations:

Crosscountry
 Birmingham New Street 1tph 
 Reading 1tph 
 Bournemouth 1tp2h
 Southampton Central 1tp2h

Avanti West Coast
 London Euston 2tph

London Northwestern
 Birmingham New Street 2tph
 Walsall 1tpd

Future services

Following the Crewe Hub consultation, it was announced that the then Transport Secretary, Chris Grayling, would ask the future West Coast Partnership operator to include a HS2 service via Stoke-on-Trent, Macclesfield and then on to terminate at Manchester.

Furthermore, there are also strong proposals to reopen the mothballed Stoke–Leek line. This would allow the town to be reconnected to the national rail network for the first time in 40 years, via Fenton Manor railway station, allowing for future metro services. The plan has received approval from the county council and is in the early construction phase of Leek (Churnet Valley) railway station and the connecting rail line.

The station surroundings 

The original, now disused, goods yard lies behind the northbound platforms. There were various proposals for its use, including an "iconic" conference centre. However, in April 2007, Virgin Trains announced that 264 new car parking spaces would be made available at Stoke-on-Trent station by January 2009, adding to the two existing small car parks. A new access road, junction and traffic lights were constructed to serve the goods yard road entrance, when the A500 upgrade was completed in 2006/7. The new car park opened October 2009.

Winton Chambers (a self-contained section of the main station building, including the entire upper floor) is currently leased to Staffordshire University, which has its main Stoke-on-Trent campuses in College Road off Station Road and in Leek Road nearby. The university also leases Nos. 1, 2 & 3 Winton Square and Nos. 4 & 5 Winton Square, which with the North Stafford Hotel and the current station comprise the original 1848 station complex. There is also a Subway outlet situated to the right of the North Stafford Hotel as you look at it.

Directly opposite the station entrance is the statue of potter Josiah Wedgwood (1730–1795), sculpted by Edward Davis and erected in 1863. Wedgwood holds in his hand an exact copy of the Portland Vase, the reproduction of which showed the British that they could at last surpass the achievements of the finest craftsmen of the Roman Empire.  The statue stands in front of the North Stafford Hotel.

Also directly opposite the station is the British Pottery Manufacturer's Federation Club ("The Potter's Club") which is a large private member's club situated in Federation House, and which is run for the benefit of the many local pottery manufacturers. It was established in 1951, and still operates.

Also the main Royal Mail depot for Stoke-on-Trent is located opposite the station next to the North Stafford Hotel. Until the early 1990s mail arrived from all over the county into Stoke station and then transferred across the road to the sorting office.

Local transport 

Local bus services stop at two bus stops on the main road, Station Road. Companies that provide services from the Station are First Potteries, D&G Buses and Arriva, serving Hanley, Stoke, and Newcastle town centres, and also Keele University. Most services connect at Hanley bus station with services covering most of North Staffordshire.

In October 2020, Stoke on Trent City Council proposed a tram network. Stoke Station would connect to Hanley, with onward trams to Tunstall and Burslem.

University Quarter 
The university has expanded rapidly in recent years and a large area to north-east of Stoke-on-Trent station is now seen as a developing University Quarter, and now absorbs the relocated sixth-form college previously sited a mile or so to the south at Fenton, and the main further education college just to the north, and possibly also the Burslem campus of Stoke-on-Trent College. This £150m "quarter" regeneration will also entail investment in the immediate surroundings of the railway station.

References

Further reading

External links 

 The North Staffordshire Railway Study Group
 Staffordshire University campus map showing proximity to the station.

Grade II* listed buildings in Staffordshire
Grade II* listed railway stations
Railway stations in Stoke-on-Trent
DfT Category C1 stations
Former North Staffordshire Railway stations
Railway stations in Great Britain opened in 1848
Railway stations served by CrossCountry
Railway stations served by East Midlands Railway
Railway stations served by West Midlands Trains
Northern franchise railway stations
Railway stations served by Avanti West Coast
Staffordshire University
Stations on the West Coast Main Line